Ibrahimwal Taraf Gulam Nabi Khan is a village in Bhulath in Kapurthala district of Punjab State, India. The village is administrated by Sarpanch an elected representative of the village.

Demography 
, The village has a total number of 4 houses and the population of 16 of which 10 are males while 6 are females. According to the report published by Census India in 2011, the village does not have any Schedule Caste or Schedule Tribe population so far.

See also
List of villages in India

References

External links 
 Tourism of Punjab
 Census of Punjab

Villages in Kapurthala district